Iraq competed at the 1964 Summer Olympics in Tokyo, Japan, which ran from October 11, 1964, to October 24, 1964. Iraq sent thirteen athletes to compete in boxing, weightlifting and track and field but did not win any medals.

Athletes

References

External links
 Official Olympic Reports

Nations at the 1964 Summer Olympics
1964
1964 in Iraqi sport